Jairo Mauricio Henríquez Ferrufino (born 31 August 1993) is a Salvadoran professional footballer who plays as a midfielder for USL Championship club Colorado Springs Switchbacks and the El Salvador national team.

Club career

Turín FESA
Henríquez was formed in Turín FESA. He came to play professionally for the club in 2013.

FAS
In January 2015, Henríquez signed with FAS. Henríquez scored a crucial goal in a 1–1 draw against Águila, in the first leg of the quarter-finals of the Apertura 2016 at the Estadio Óscar Quiteño, in November 2016. However, FAS lost 1–3 on aggregate.

Municipal Limeño
Henríquez signed with Municipal Limeño for the Clausura 2018.

Santa Tecla
Henríquez signed with Santa Tecla FC for the Apertura 2018. Henríquez scored a crucial goal in a 3–2 win against Águila in the Estadio Juan Francisco Barraza, on 5 December 2018.

International career
He was called up to the El Salvador team for the 2015 CONCACAF Gold Cup, where he played in El Salvador's second game against Costa Rica.

International goals
Scores and results list El Salvador's goal tally first, score column indicates score after each Henríquez goal.

References

External links
 
 

1993 births
Living people
Salvadoran footballers
Sportspeople from San Salvador
Association football midfielders
Tlaxcala F.C. players
C.D. FAS footballers
Municipal Limeño footballers
Santa Tecla F.C. footballers
C.D. Chalatenango footballers
C.D. Águila footballers
Liga Premier de México players
Salvadoran Primera División players
El Salvador international footballers
El Salvador under-20 international footballers
2015 CONCACAF Gold Cup players
2021 CONCACAF Gold Cup players
Salvadoran expatriate footballers
Expatriate footballers in Mexico
Salvadoran expatriate sportspeople in Mexico
Colorado Springs Switchbacks FC players